Jadwiga Żylińska (Wroclaw, 17 August 1910–Warsaw, 25 April 2009) was a Polish author. Mainly a novelist and essayist, she also wrote the screenplay for Rozstanie (1961).

References

1910 births
2009 deaths
Polish women novelists
Polish women essayists
Polish women screenwriters
Polish essayists
20th-century Polish novelists
20th-century essayists
20th-century Polish women writers
20th-century Polish screenwriters